Too Long may refer to:

Music
 Too Long, a 1983 album by Locomotiv GT
 "2 Long" (Andrzej Piaseczny song), 2001
 "Too Long", a song by Daft Punk from Discovery, 2001
 "Too Long", a song by Lokomotiv GT, 1983
 "Too Long", a song by Magnum Bonum, 1978
 "Too Long", a song by Tanya Tucker, 1983
 "Too Long", a song by Terri Gibbs, 1981

See also
 
 Long (disambiguation)